Guntur West mandal is one of the 58 mandals in Guntur district of the Indian state of Andhra Pradesh. It is under the administration of Guntur revenue division and was formed by bifurcating Guntur urban mandal into Guntur East and Guntur West, with its headquarters at Guntur.

Governance 

The mandal is under the administration of a tahsildar. It forms part of the Andhra Pradesh Capital Region, under the jurisdiction of the APCRDA. Guntur west assembly constituency represents the state assembly and it is a segment of Guntur Lok sabha constituency.

Settlements 
Guntur West mandal covers a western part of Guntur Municipal Corporation and its urban agglomerations namely, Ankireddipalem, Chowdavaram, Guntur West constituency, Koritepadu, Nallapadu, Pedapalakaluru, Pothuru and R Agraharam. Except Chinapalakaluru, all other areas were already de-notified and merged with Guntur Municipal Corporation in 2012.

See also 
 List of mandals in Andhra Pradesh
 Villages in Guntur mandal

References 

Mandals in Guntur district
2018 establishments in Andhra Pradesh